Norberto Soto Figueroa is a Puerto Rican politician and the former mayor of Patillas. Soto is affiliated with the Popular Democratic Party (PPD) and has served as mayor since 2013.He lost to Martiza Sánchez Neris in 2020

References

Living people
Mayors of places in Puerto Rico
Popular Democratic Party (Puerto Rico) politicians
People from Patillas, Puerto Rico
Puerto Rican people of Galician descent
Year of birth missing (living people)